Nai Chopkhotchaprasit  was a Rear Palace of Kingdom of Ayutthaya in Ban Phlu Luang dynasty. He was the first Rear Palace of Kingdom of Ayutthaya.

|-

Ban Phlu Luang dynasty
Rear Palaces
17th-century Thai people
Year of birth missing
Year of death missing